Eric Clapton is the debut studio album by English rock musician Eric Clapton, released in August 1970 by Atco and Polydor Records.

Background and artwork
After being in several successful rock bands including The Yardbirds, John Mayall & the Bluesbreakers, Cream and Blind Faith, Clapton recorded an album under his own name in late 1969 and early 1970. The album cover, photographed by Barry Feinstein, depicts Clapton sitting in a Los Angeles photo studio while smoking a cigarette, his Fender Stratocaster Brownie electric guitar leaning between his legs.

Recording
Clapton recorded some tracks in November 1969 at London's Olympic Studios and went on to record more songs in 1970 in two sessions; one in January 1970 at the Village Recorders Studio in West Los Angeles and a second session in March the same year at Island Studios in London. A large number of musicians that worked with Clapton on the album had been working with the band Delaney & Bonnie, which previously opened the Blind Faith gigs. The musicians included the core of Derek & the Dominos, including co-creator and co-songwriter Bobby Whitlock, who can be heard on "Let It Rain".

The song "Let it Rain" had originally been recorded with different lyrics as "She Rides". Three mixes of the album were done, one by Delaney Bramlett, one by Tom Dowd and one by Clapton himself. The 11-track album, Dowd mix was the one used for the original release. Bramlett's 10-track album mix without "Told You for the Last Time," is included in the Deluxe Edition released on CD in 2006.

In an interview from 2006, promoting The Road to Escondido, Clapton recalled that he was very happy making this album and was pleased with the results of the recording sessions, but also noted that "the only thing [he] didn't like about the album is [his] voice", because it sounds so "high" and "young", which Clapton disliked, because he "always wanted to sound like an old guy".

Critical reception

Contemporary reviews were largely positive. Rolling Stone noted the "warm, friendly" aspect of the record, commending "Clapton's voice" and the "mean guitar". Robert Christgau rated the album with the "B" mark and noted: "I blame a conceptual error, rather than Clapton's uncertain singing, for the overall thinness. As a sideman, Clapton slipped into producer Delaney Bramlett's downhome bliss as easily as he did into Cream's blues dreamscape, but as a solo artist he can't simulate Delaney's optimism".

In a retrospective review for AllMusic Stephen Thomas Erlewine feels that Clapton "sounds more laid-back and straightforward than any of the guitarist's previous recordings. There are still elements of blues and rock & roll, but they're hidden beneath layers of gospel, R&B, country, and pop flourishes. And the pop element of the record is the strongest of the album's many elements". Erlewine finishes his summary by stating "it's encouraging to hear him grow and become a more fully rounded musician, but too often the album needs the spark that some long guitar solos would have given it. In short, it needs a little more of Clapton's personality." Q magazine described the album as swinging "like leaves in the breeze".

Track listings

Personnel 
 Eric Clapton – lead guitar, lead vocals
 Delaney Bramlett – rhythm guitars, backing vocals
 Stephen Stills – guitars, bass ("Let It Rain"), backing vocals
 Leon Russell – piano
 John Simon – piano
 Bobby Whitlock – organ, backing vocals
 Carl Radle – bass
 Jim Gordon – drums
 Tex Johnson – percussion
 Bobby Keys – saxophones
 Jim Price – trumpet
 Jerry Allison – backing vocals
 Bonnie Bramlett – backing vocals
 Rita Coolidge – backing vocals
 Sonny Curtis – backing vocals

Production 
 Producer and arranged by Delaney Bramlett
 Engineer – Bill Halverson
 Recorded at The Village Recorder (Los Angeles, California)
 Photography and album design – Barry Feinstein 
 Equipment – Bill Reed, Clark

Charts

References

External links

Eric Clapton albums
1970 debut albums
Polydor Records albums
Atco Records albums
Albums produced by Delaney Bramlett
Albums recorded at Olympic Sound Studios